Bahariasauridae is a potential family of averostran theropods that might include a handful of African and South American genera, such as Aoniraptor, Bahariasaurus, Deltadromeus, and Gualicho. The placement of these theropods is controversial, with some studies placing them as basal ceratosaurs possibly related to Noasauridae (which they may also include the otherwise noasaurid subfamily Elaphrosaurinae), others classifying them as megaraptorans, basal neovenatorids, or basal coelurosaurs. There is also a possibility the group might not be monophyletic, as a monograph on the vertebrate diversity in the Kem Kem Beds published in 2020 found Bahariasaurus to be nomen dubium. In the same paper Deltadromeus is classified as an noasaurid, a result also recovered by some previous studies.

References

Prehistoric neotheropods
Cenomanian first appearances